Ramona Ygnacia Martínez (born 21 July 1996) is a Paraguayan professional footballer who plays as a midfielder for Brazilian Série A1 club SE Palmeiras and the Paraguay women's national team. She is also a futsal player.

International career
Martínez played for Paraguay at senior level in the 2018 Copa América Femenina.

References

1996 births
Living people
Paraguayan women's footballers
Women's association football midfielders
Deportivo Capiatá players
Paraguay women's international footballers
Paraguayan women's futsal players